The 1970 Cork Intermediate Football Championship was the 35th staging of the Cork Intermediate Football Championship since its establishment by the Cork County Board in 1909. The draw for the opening round fixtures took place on 25 January 1970.

The final, which was a replay, was played on 15 November 1970 at the Athletic Grounds in Cork, between St. Finbarr's and Youghal, in what was their first ever meeting in the final. St. Finbarr's won the match by 3-06 to 1-07 to claim their first second championship title overall and a first title in 40 years.

Results

Final

References

Cork Intermediate Football Championship